The Scout and Guide movement in Guyana is served by two organisations 
 Guyana Girl Guides Association, member of the World Association of Girl Guides and Girl Scouts
 The Scout Association of Guyana, member of the World Organization of the Scout Movement

See also

References